This is an overview of the progression of the world track cycling record of the men's 4 km individual pursuit as recognised by the Union Cycliste Internationale.

World record progression

Amateurs (1964–1992)

Open (from 1993)

World bests (sea level)

References

Track cycling world record progressions